Dr. Gopal Krishna Nayak was professor of information systems at XIMB.

He was the director of IIIT Bhubaneswar.

Research interests
 ERP and enterprise systems
 Group decision support systems
 Knowledge management
 e-governance

Software development
His hobby is part-time programming. Various products have emerged from this hobby.

Mandaar University Management System (M-UMS)– This is an ERP system for institutes of higher learning. It covers all aspects of an managing an institute including academics, accounting, payroll, HR, library, hostels etc.

 PAMIS – Project-based accounting system. This software has been adopted by the Panchyati Raj Department of Government of Odisha and is used to manage accounts of three tier panchayat system : 30 DRDAs, 314 Blocks, and above 6000 Panchyats.

Administrative responsibilities

Present responsibilities 

 Vice-president, BMMA
 Technology Adviser (XIMB)
 Director, IDCOL software Limited
 Director, OCAC
 Adviser, Panchyati Raj Department, Govt of Orissa

Former responsibilities 

 Director, KIIT 2005–2006
 Dean, academic, XIMB 1999–2002
 Coordinator, Admissions, XIMB 1995–1999
 Coordinator, Information Systems Area, XIMB 1994–2002
 General Chair ICIT 2008
 Director, IIIT Bhubaneswar, Jul 2007 - Apr 2021

See also
 IIIT Bhubaneswar
 XIMB

References

External links
 Faculty Profile XIMB
 Faculty Profile IIIT-BH

Academic staff of Kalinga Institute of Industrial Technology
Living people
IIT Kharagpur alumni
Indian Institute of Management Bangalore alumni
1960 births